The second USS High Ball, also written Highball, was a United States Navy patrol vessel acquired briefly in late 1918.

High Ball was built as a private motorboat of the same name in 1905. In November 1918, the U.S. Navy acquired her from her owner, W. W. Smithers of Cape May, New Jersey, for use as a section patrol boat during World War I. Unlike the vast majority of civilian boats and craft taken into U.S. Navy service for use as patrol boats during World War I, High Ball never received a section patrol number. She became one of two boats of the name in U.S. Navy service at the time, the other being .

High Ball briefly was assigned to the 4th Naval District. The end of World War I on 11 November 1918 led the Navy to return High Ball to Smithers on 2 December 1918.

References
 
 Highball at Department of the Navy Naval History and Heritage Command Online Library of Selected Images: U.S. Navy Ships -- Listed by Hull Number "SP" #s and "ID" #s -- World War I Era Acquired Vessels without Numbers (listed alphabetically by name)
 NavSource Online: Section Patrol Craft Photo Archive High Ball

Patrol vessels of the United States Navy
World War I patrol vessels of the United States
1905 ships